USS LST-6 was an LST-1-class tank landing ship of the United States Navy. LST-6 served in the European Theater of Operations, participating in the Allied invasion of Sicily, the Salerno Landings, and the Normandy landings. She was mined and sunk on 17 November 1944.

Construction 
LST-6 was laid down on 20 July 1942 at Dravo Corporation in Wilmington, Delaware, launched on 21 October 1942, sponsored by Mrs. H. E. Haven; and commissioned on 30 January 1943.

Service history 
LST-6 was assigned to the European Theatre and participated in the following operations, for which she received three battle stars:
 Sicilian Occupation – 9–15 July 1943
 Salerno landings – 9–21 September 1943
 Invasion of Normandy – 6–25 June 1944
LST-6 participated in the landings at Omaha Beach as part of Assault Group O3. In August 1944, Lieutenant W.H. Weddle took command. LST-6 struck a mine and sank in the English Channel while returning from a supply movement from  Portland to Rouen on 17 November 1944. She was struck from the Navy List on 22 December 1944.

References 

1942 ships
Ships built in Wilmington, Delaware
LST-1-class tank landing ships of the United States Navy
World War II amphibious warfare vessels of the United States
Shipwrecks in the English Channel
Ships sunk by mines
Maritime incidents in November 1944
Ships built by Dravo Corporation